Clear Blue Sky was a British progressive rock band officially formed in London, England, but better known in Italy.

History
Clear Blue Sky (earlier known as Jug Blues) were discovered by Nirvana musician Patrick Campbell-Lyons. Signed by Vertigo, they released their first self-titled album on that label, produced by Ashley Kozak.

In 2003, the Italian record label, Akarma Records, reissued their first vinyl album.

Discography

Studio albums
 1970: Clear Blue Sky (Vertigo)
 1990: Destiny (Saturn)
 1996: Cosmic Crusader

Live albums
2001: Out of the Blue

References

Vertigo Records artists